Meg Scott Phipps is an American former politician who served as the Commissioner of Agriculture for the state of North Carolina from 2001 to 2003.

Early life
From Mebane, North Carolina, she is the daughter of former North Carolina governor Bob Scott and Jessie Rae Scott, as well as the granddaughter of former U.S. Senator and North Carolina Governor W. Kerr Scott.  Phipps is a 1978 graduate of Wake Forest University and a 1981 graduate of the Norman Adrian Wiggins School of Law at Campbell University.

Career
A Democrat, she was elected to the position of Agriculture Commissioner in November 2000. Controversy erupted less than a month into her term when she selected a new midway vendor for the North Carolina State Fair, replacing a longtime vendor, who immediately filed suit against the state.

In May 2001, allegations emerged of inappropriate use of campaign funds from her 2000 campaign.

Resignation and criminal charges
After two campaign aides were indicted and one pleaded guilty to federal fraud and extortion charges, North Carolina Governor Mike Easley asked Phipps to resign her position. On June 6, 2003, she resigned and was replaced by interim commissioner Britt Cobb.

In October 2003, Phipps was tried and found guilty of perjury and obstruction of justice charges; soon afterwards, she pleaded guilty to five of the original 30 federal charges against her, including fraud, conspiracy, and witness tampering. In March 2004, she was sentenced to four years in federal prison and served her sentence at Alderson Federal Prison Camp in West Virginia.

While in prison, Phipps became friends with Martha Stewart, who was also incarcerated there. While serving her sentence, Phipps taught English and other courses to her fellow inmates. She was briefly allowed out to attend her brother Kerr's funeral.

Later life 
On April 23, 2007, Phipps was released from prison. Hawfields Presbyterian Church hired her as its director of Christian education. Monitored by an ankle bracelet for six months, she could only leave her house to tend to work-related affairs. After three years she was hired by Alamance Community College to teach women's studies and undertook further education at the University of North Carolina at Greensboro. She later worked as an administrator for assisted living facilities in Mebane and Chapel Hill before retiring and moving with her husband to Lake Lure in 2017.

Footnotes

Works cited

External links
Collection of news stories about Phipps and the scandal

Place of birth missing (living people)
Year of birth missing (living people)
Living people
North Carolina Commissioners of Agriculture
People from Mebane, North Carolina
Women in North Carolina politics
North Carolina Democrats
Politicians convicted of extortion under color of official right
American perjurers
People convicted of obstruction of justice
Campbell University alumni
Wake Forest University alumni
American Presbyterians
North Carolina politicians convicted of crimes
Meg